Poppy Jhakra (born 1984) is an English actress from West Yorkshire. She is best known for her roles in Waterloo Road and Coronation Street.

Jhakra has appeared in Holby City, Waking the Dead and Doctors. She graduated from Rose Bruford College with a First Class degree in American Theatre Arts in 2005, spending a year on American conventions and techniques in Texas.

Jhakra has also appeared in Peter Kosminskys two part Channel 4 docu-film Britz. Following this she landed the part of the rebellious teenager Minnie Chandra in Coronation Street, who she played for eighteen months. She initially auditioned for a different part, but impressed producers so much so in her meeting that the role of Minnie was written in for her.

Jhakra was also cast in Scallywagger and Inn Mates starring Neil Morrissey, comedy sketch shows for the BBC playing various characters.

In July 2010, Jhakra was cast as new ambitious English teacher Eleanor Chaudry in the BBC One school-based drama series, Waterloo Road.
 
Jhakra has also given a one-woman show called Dance Without Movement in which she took her audiences through a journey of a young Asian woman's life in England as well as performing as Princess Jasmine in Aladdin at the Theatre Royal, Windsor for Bill Kenwright during Christmas 2009.

In August 2016, Jhakra appeared as "tricky" agency nurse Amira Zafar in a feature-length special episode of Casualty, broadcast on 27 August 2016. Jhakra revealed on 5 October 2016 that Amira would appear in one further episode of the show, which she filmed between 5 October and 7 October. Jhakra later appeared in episodes of Holby City in 2017, and 2019 as agency nurse Amira Zafar.

References

External links
Poppy Jhakra at the Internet Movie Database

1985 births
Living people
British actresses of South Asian descent
English soap opera actresses